Norman Jacobs (born 19 May 1947) is a British author of more than 25 books on the topics of sport and local history.

Jacobs spent most of his career at the British Museum where he worked for 37 years before taking early retirement in 2004.

References

1947 births
Living people
People from Hackney, London
British writers